Vyash Gobind (born 22 December 1984) is a South African cricketer who played first-class and List A cricket for KwaZulu-Natal and Dolphins. Vyash's older brother Rivash also played first-class and List A cricket for KwaZulu-Natal and Dolphins, as well as South Africa U-19s, and their father played club cricket in South Africa.

Career
Aged 18, Gobind represented Dolphins U-19 in a warm up match against Bangladesh; Gobind took two wickets. In the same year, Gobind was diagnosed with testicular cancer. He survived, and said that he was inspired by testicular cancer survivors Dave Callaghan and Lance Armstrong. Gobind made his first-class debut in a 2004/05 UCB Provincial Cup match for KwaZulu-Natal against Northerns. He took 2/80 in the first innings, and 0/50 in the second innings. He made his List A debut in a 2007/08 Provincial One-Day Challenge match against Border; Gobind took 1/40 from 9 overs. Gobind played one Twenty20 match for Dolphins against Highveld Lions in the 2009/10 Pro20 Series; Gobind took 1/34 from 3.1 overs.

Gobind now plays club cricket for Chatsworth Sporting Club. In a 2012/13 match for Chatsworth against Crusaders, Gobind took 3/34 from 8 overs, as Chatsworth were dismissed for 100.

Notes

References

External links

Living people
1984 births
South African cricketers
Dolphins cricketers